Hans Priller (born 6 March 1971) is an Austrian former professional tennis player.

Priller, who had a career high singles world ranking of 309, featured twice the main draw of the Austrian Open Kitzbühel, as a wildcard in both 1988 and 1989. He is the elder brother of WTA Tour player Ulrike Priller.

References

External links
 
 

1971 births
Living people
Austrian male tennis players